Christmas Time is a holiday EP by the American vocalist Wendy Moten and was released on October 25, 1995.

Track listing

1995 albums
Wendy Moten albums
Contemporary R&B Christmas albums
Pop Christmas albums